West Marin is the largest rural region of Marin County, California.

The West Marin Chamber of Commerce includes seven unincorporated communities in its definition of West Marin: Point Reyes Station, Olema, Stinson Beach, Bolinas, Tomales, Dillon Beach, and Inverness. West Marin is generally considered to be west of Muir Beach and Nicasio on the Pacific Ocean side of Mount Tamalpais.

The Point Reyes Light is a weekly newspaper covering West Marin, and the website of the Marin Independent Journal has a category for West Marin news. And KWMR is their public radio station.

Unlike the rest of the county, which is served by Golden Gate Transit, West Marin is served only by Marin Transit, which connects to Golden Gate Transit lines at Marin City and in the San Geronimo Valley, among other locations.

The Environmental Action Committee of West Marin, active since the 1970s, focuses on environmental issues such as preserving open space and protecting vulnerable species.

The Straus Family Creamery is just north of Marshall.

References

External links

West Marin official site
West Marin Citizen homepage
West Marin News

 
Geography of Marin County, California